Luangwa is an extinct genus of traversodontid cynodonts. The species Luangwa drysdalli was discovered 1963 in the valley of the Luangwa river in Zambia, Africa. Luangwa lived in the Triassic period 240 Million years ago.

In July 2008, a skull of Luangwa sudamericana was found in the Brazilian town of Dona Francisca (Rio Grande do Sul), which is part of the Geopark Paleorrota. The discovery was made by a team of the ULBRA.

References

External links
 Grupo acha crânio de cinodonte. 
 Gazeta do Sul.' 

Traversodontids
Prehistoric cynodont genera
Middle Triassic synapsids of South America
Middle Triassic synapsids of Africa
Fossil taxa described in 1963